The Memory Wars: Freud's Legacy in Dispute is a 1995 book that reprints articles by the critic Frederick Crews critical of Sigmund Freud, the founder of psychoanalysis, and recovered-memory therapy. It also reprints letters from Harold P. Blum, Marcia Cavell, Morris Eagle, Matthew Erdelyi, Allen Esterson, Robert R. Holt, James Hopkins, Lester Luborsky, David D. Olds, Mortimer Ostow, Bernard L. Pacella, Herbert S. Peyser, Charlotte Krause Prozan, Theresa Reid, James L. Rice, Jean Schimek, and Marian Tolpin.

The book had a mixed reception. The articles by Crews it reprinted, including "The Unknown Freud", have been seen as turning points in the popular reception of Freud and psychoanalysis, and some commentators credited Crews with discrediting Freud's theories and convincingly criticizing recovered-memory therapy. However, others criticized him for failing to resolve the issues he explored and questioned his understanding of repression. He has been seen as presenting some of the most extreme criticism of Freud.

Summary

The Memory Wars reprints essays and letters about Sigmund Freud, psychoanalysis, and recovered-memory therapy that first appeared in The New York Review of Books, as well as an afterword by Crews that first appeared in The Times Higher Education Supplement. In addition to Crews, the contributors include Harold P. Blum, Marcia Cavell, Morris Eagle, Matthew Erdelyi, Allen Esterson, Robert R. Holt, James Hopkins, Lester Luborsky, David D. Olds, Mortimer Ostow, Bernard L. Pacella, Herbert S. Peyser, Charlotte Krause Prozan, Theresa Reid, James L. Rice, Jean Schimek, Marian Tolpin; another contributor was identified with the pseudonym "Penelope". Crews writes that his initial purpose in writing the book reviews included in the work was to explain how scholarly understanding of Freud and psychoanalysis has been changed by recent studies and "methodological critiques". He adds that he expected one of his articles would be controversial. The article was published under the title "The Unknown Freud", and was followed by "The Revenge of the Repressed".

In "The Unknown Freud", Crews writes that psychoanalysis is in decline due to its limited effectiveness as a form of treatment. He discusses critiques of psychoanalysis such as the philosopher Adolf Grünbaum's The Foundations of Psychoanalysis (1984) and the psychologist Malcolm Macmillan's Freud Evaluated (1991); he maintains that no one has refuted Grünbaum's charge that clinical evidence cannot be used to validate "Freudian hypotheses" and that Macmillan convincingly criticizes Freud's theories of personality and neurosis. In "The Revenge of the Repressed", Crews criticizes recovered-memory therapy and discusses the case of Ross Cheit, arguing that while Cheit had "proved beyond question that his suddenly recalled 1968 molestation by a music camp administrator was real", it was questionable whether Cheit had ever repressed his memory of the incident. Crews suggests that Cheit "lost track of the incident" due to normal atrophy of memory and that his restored memory is therefore "useless as a proof of repression."

Publication history
The Memory Wars was published in 1995 by The New York Review of Books.

Reception

Reviews
The Memory Wars received positive reviews from the author Richard Webster in The Times Literary Supplement and the journalist Nicci Gerrard in New Statesman, mixed reviews from Vivian Dent in The New York Times Book Review, Laura Miller in Salon, and Elizabeth Gleick in Time, and negative reviews from the anthropologist Marilyn Ivy in The Nation and Brett Kahr in Psychoanalytic Studies. The book was also reviewed by Genevieve Stuttaford in Publishers Weekly, Sarah Boxer in The New York Times Book Review, the psychiatrist Anthony Storr in The Times, the biographer Paul Ferris in The Spectator, Peter L. Rudnytsky in American Imago, and by The Economist.

Webster credited Crews with providing a useful overview of recent criticism of Freud and convincingly criticizing psychoanalysis and recovered-memory therapy. However, he considered Crews too quick to assume that Freud was deliberately dishonest rather than self-deluded. He also suggested that because Crews's articles had been published in The New York Review of Books, which had been considered a magazine sympathetic to psychoanalysis, they aroused anger from psychoanalysts. Gerrard wrote that Crews discredited Freud. Dent wrote that The Memory Wars "provides an example of how people can absorb volumes of identical evidence without changing utterly divergent opinions". While she wrote that the book raised important issues relevant to psychotherapy, such as the reliability of memory, the validity of the concept of repression, and the effects of therapies aimed at recovering memories, "true dialogue on these questions never emerges", and that the book "the book presents a mass of conflicting statements" from experts.

Miller compared the book to "an online discussion". She described Crews's discussion of recovered-memory therapy as "scathing" and praised his style of writing. She credited Crews with supporting his objections to Freud's personal qualities and theories empirically with careful research, but also wrote that Crews's work could seem crankish and obsessive. She observed that scientific debate about repression could continue interminably, like an Internet "flame war". She wrote that while Crews argued that the major premises of psychoanalysis are unsupported by scientific data, it was debatable how "coolly quantifiable" study of the mind and the emotions could be. She suggested that Freud's view of memory made for a "better story" than that of Crews and argued that Crews did not explain why Freud's views often felt as though they were true.

Gleick considered the book an "impressive dissection of Freud and the recovered memory movement". However, while she wrote that "Crews demolishes Freud neatly, and his insistence that we rely on empirical evidence is perfectly reasonable", she added that "such evidence often does not exist when it comes to the emotional realm" or where "long-ago child abuse" was concerned. She also suggested that because he considered Freud a charlatan and rejected psychoanalysis, Crews had to "dismiss the more interesting questions: What do our society's obsessions with child abuse, or Satanic rituals, or aliens, really mean?"

Ivy described the New York Review essays that Crews reprinted as "cranky", and criticized Crews for oversimplifying the issues involved in the debates over recovered memory and sexual abuse, and failing to account for the social context that made the concern with ritual abuse possible. She considered Crews's claim that psychoanalysis is unscientific familiar and unoriginal and wrote that his, "valorization of science makes him uncomfortable indeed with ambiguity, not to mention undecidability." Kahr called the book a "vicious piece of rhetoric" and argued that Crews's arguments against psychoanalysis were based on "scant solid data" and employed "the most purple prose I have read in many years". He also accused Crews of ignorance.

Other evaluations
Webster described The Memory Wars as one of the most trenchant and significant contributions to the debate on recovered-memory therapy. The psychologist Jennifer Freyd wrote that Crews made incorrect claims about Cheit's case and that Cheit himself had objected to Crews's account of how he remembered being sexually abused as a child. She also argued that Crews's understanding of repression was confused and that he was mistaken to claim that Cheit's case was irrelevant to the repressed memory debate. The philosopher John Forrester described Crews's article "The Unknown Freud" as a celebrated and widely-read article. He criticized Crews for discussing Grünbaum's criticisms of psychoanalysis in The Foundations of Psychoanalysis as though they were "already proven and widely accepted" and for presenting a "deeply personal" attack on Freud as though it were scholarly criticism. He noted that while Crews made criticisms of psychoanalysis similar to those already made by Grünbaum, he took them to extremes. He also accused Crews of having a "bizarre view" of "how scientists operate". The literature scholar Ritchie Robertson described The Memory Wars as representing "the more polemical version of anti-Freudian criticism". The psychologist Michael Billig described Crews as one of the most notable critics of Freud to have suggested that the memories reported by Freud's patients were suggested by Freud himself. He criticized Crews's view that repression must be understood as a completely unconscious process.

The psychologist Louis Breger described Crews as one of Freud's most dismissive critics. He considered some of Crews' points valuable, but maintained that Crews, like other critics of Freud, too frequently jumps "from valid criticisms of some part of Freud's work to a condemnation of the whole." The psychoanalyst Juliet Mitchell described "The Unknown Freud" as an important attack on Freud and psychoanalysis. However, she criticized it and Crews's other articles, arguing that Crews wrongly claimed that psychoanalysis was responsible for the recovered memory movement. She argued that the two are connected not by an emphasis on parental seduction or abuse, but by the fact that in both cases their patients use discussion of sexuality as "the main manifestation of their condition." She also argued that Crews misunderstood Freud's view of memory, and that of psychoanalysis more generally, and incorrectly claimed that hysteria does not exist. The political scientist José Brunner described "The Unknown Freud" as the beginning of the "Freud Wars", a long-running debate over Freud's reputation, work and impact. The philosopher Todd Dufresne suggested that The Memory Wars may be the book for which Crews is best known, and that the articles it reprinted were turning points in the popular reception of Freud and psychoanalysis.

See also
 Why Freud Was Wrong

References

Bibliography
Books

 
 
 
 
 
 
 
 
 
 
 

Journals

  
  
  
 
  
  
  
  
  
  
  This review was followed by an exchange of letters between Crews and Webster in TLS, which are collected under the title, "Freud and the Judaeo-Christian tradition."
  

Online articles

 

1995 non-fiction books
American non-fiction books
Books about Sigmund Freud
Books by Frederick Crews
English-language books
Works originally published in The New York Review of Books